Suzanne Mulvey (née Malone; born 4 October 1984) is a Scottish footballer who plays as a forward and represented Scotland at the senior international level.

Club career
Mulvey started her playing career with Hibernian after moving up from their youth teams.

In the 2005 summer season, Mulvey played in Iceland with ÍBV and scored three goals in ten Úrvalsdeild appearances.

Her spell with Hibernian showcased her as one of the most promising young players in Scotland at the time and brought her to the attention of everyone in the game, however, Mulvey brought her time with Hibernian to an end when she moved to play for Hamilton.

After Hamilton, she spent a brief spell at Glasgow City, where her time was hampered by a knee injury, before Mulvey moved to Celtic in late 2007, where she endured a somewhat unsuccessful period.

Mulvey moved back to Glasgow City in the 2009 close season and started her time with the club, in Lithuania, in the UEFA Women's Champions League, where she scored four goals in their game against Norchi Dinamoeli, from Georgia.

In 2011 Mulvey returned to Hamilton Academical on loan after a back injury had curtailed her involvement with City over the previous two years.

In December 2013 Mulvey signed for Rangers Ladies and in her first start for the club she scored the winner in a 2–1 victory over rivals Celtic. Having scored 18 goals so far this season Mulvey looks to be back in the top form she has previously shown. She signed for Sunderland in February 2015 after a trial period in which she scored a hat-trick against her former Rangers teammates, then scored again in a win over Everton.

In January 2018, Mulvey signed for Motherwell, reuniting her with her former Glasgow City boss Eddie Wolecki Black.

International career
According to the SFA's website, Mulvey made her debut for the senior Scotland side in February 2007, against Japan. However, Rec.Sport.Soccer Statistics Foundation reports that she had scored goals for the senior team against Switzerland and the Czech Republic in 2004. She played twice more in the 2006–07 season before losing her place in the squad. In August 2009, following her early season form at Glasgow City, Mulvey was recalled to the Scotland squad after a two-year absence for the game against Switzerland.

Personal life

On 13 August 2013 Mulvey (previously Malone) married Elaine Mulvey in Leith, Edinburgh. They have three sons Lindan, Arroe and Ardan.
 
Suzanne Mulvey is the founder & director of Sentinel Sports Ltd. Sentinel Sports is a US college recruitment and placing company helping young talented athletes in the American scholarship process. www.sentinel-sports.co.uk

References

External links

Official Website of Glasgow City F.C.

1984 births
Living people
Footballers from Edinburgh
Scottish women's footballers
Scotland women's international footballers
Hibernian W.F.C. players
Celtic F.C. Women players
Glasgow City F.C. players
Expatriate women's footballers in Iceland
Sunderland A.F.C. Ladies players
Women's Super League players
Women's association football forwards
Suzanne Mulvey
Scottish expatriate women's footballers
Scottish expatriate sportspeople in Iceland
Hamilton Academical W.F.C. players
Motherwell L.F.C. players
Rangers W.F.C. players
LGBT association football players
Scottish LGBT sportspeople
Lesbian sportswomen